Kolkata Dakshin Lok Sabha constituency (earlier known as Calcutta South Lok Sabha constituency) is one of the 543 Lok Sabha (parliamentary) constituencies in India. The constituency centres on the southern part of Kolkata in West Bengal. While four of the seven legislative assembly segments on No. 23 Kolkata Dakshin Lok Sabha constituency are in Kolkata district, three are in South 24 Parganas district.

Legislative Assembly Segments

After the implementation of the order of the Delimitation Commission of India constituted in 2002, in respect of the delimitation of constituencies in the West Bengal, the Lok Sabha (parliamentary) constituency no. 23, Kolkata Dakshin is composed of the following legislative assembly segments:

Members of Parliament

Election Results

General election 2019
Source:Source

General election 2014

Bye election 2011
A bye election was held in this constituency in 2011 which was necessitated by the resignation of sitting MP Mamata Banerjee and her subsequent election to the State Assembly from the Bhabanipur Assembly constituency. In the by-election, Subrata Bakshi of Trinamool Congress defeated his nearest rival Ritabrata Banerjee of CPI(M) by 2,30,099 votes.

General election 2009

|-
! style="background-color:#E9E9E9;text-align:left;" width=225 |Party
! style="background-color:#E9E9E9;text-align:right;" |Seats won
! style="background-color:#E9E9E9;text-align:right;" |Seat change
! style="background-color:#E9E9E9;text-align:right;" |Vote percentage
|-
| style="text-align:left;" |Trinamool Congress
| style="text-align:center;" | 19
| style="text-align:center;" | 18
| style="text-align:center;" | 31.8
|-
| style="text-align:left;" |Indian National Congress
| style="text-align:center;" | 6
| style="text-align:center;" | 0
| style="text-align:center;" | 13.45
|-
| style="text-align:left;" |Socialist Unity Centre of India (Communist) 
| style="text-align:center;" | 1
| style="text-align:center;" | 1
| style="text-align:center;" | NA
|-
|-
| style="text-align:left;" |Communist Party of India (Marxist)
| style="text-align:center;" | 9
| style="text-align:center;" | 17
| style="text-align:center;" | 33.1
|-
| style="text-align:left;" |Communist Party of India
| style="text-align:center;" | 2
| style="text-align:center;" | 1
| style="text-align:center;" | 3.6
|-
| style="text-align:left;" |Revolutionary Socialist Party
| style="text-align:center;" | 2
| style="text-align:center;" | 1
| style="text-align:center;" | 3.56
|-
| style="text-align:left;" |Forward bloc
| style="text-align:center;" | 2
| style="text-align:center;" | 1
| style="text-align:center;" | 3.04
|-
| style="text-align:left;" |Bharatiya Janata Party
| style="text-align:center;" | 1
| style="text-align:center;" | 1
| style="text-align:center;" | 6.14
|-
|}

General election 2004

General election 1999

General election 1998

General election 1996

General election 1991

General election 1989

General election 1984

General election 1980

General elections 1951-2004
Calcutta South constituency came into existence in 1967. However, different constituencies existed in the area. Results of such constituencies are also included here. Most of the contests were multi-cornered. However, only winners and runners-up are mentioned below:

See also
 Kolkata
 List of Constituencies of the Lok Sabha

References

External links
Kolkata Dakshin lok sabha  constituency election 2019 result details

Lok Sabha constituencies in West Bengal
Politics of Kolkata district